The Earth/fertility Mississippian cult was associated with earthen platform mounds.

The act of rebuilding the mounds, of adding additional layers of earth over burials, served as a symbol of renewal, which renewed the earthwork as much as human life. The earthen platform served as the earth, a symbolism which endured into historic times. There are historically documented connections between additions to platforms mounds and the communal "Green Corn Ceremony", which celebrated the new harvest and the fertility of the earth. The quadrilateral, flat-topped design of many platform mounds may represent the Southeastern American Indian belief that the earth was a flat surface oriented towards four quarters of the world.

See also
 Mississippian stone statuary

References

External links

Mississippian culture
Native American religion